= Igor Koić =

Serbian-Greek footballer

Personal information
- Full name: Igor Koić
- Date of birth: 9 July 1990 (age 36)
- Place of birth: Kruševac, SFR Yugoslavia
- Height: 1.73 m (5 ft 8 in)
- Position: Attacking midfielder

Youth career
- 2006–2008: Pierikos

Senior career*
Years	Team	Apps	(Gls)
2008–2013	Pierikos	34	(0)
2013–2014	AEL	0	(0)
2014–2015	Pierikos	3	(0)
- * Club domestic league appearances and goals as of 6 September 2015

Igor Koić (Serbian: Игор Коић; born 9 July 1990) is a Serbian-Greek footballer.
